Imaichi may refer to:

Places
 Imaichi, Tochigi, Kanto, Honshu, Japan; a city
 Imaichi Station, Nikkou, Tochigi, Kanto, Honshu, Japan; a train station
 Imaichi Dam, Togawa River, Tochigi, Kanto, Honshu, Japan; a gravity dam
 Imaichi Pumped Storage Power Station, Tochigi, Kanto, Honshu, Japan; a dual dam gravity battery

Other uses
 Ryuji Imaichi (born 1986) Japanese singer

See also

 
 
 Taishibashi-Imaichi Station, Osaka Metro, Osaka, Japan; a rapid transit station
 Shimo-Imaichi Station, Nikkou, Tochigi, Kanto, Honshu, Japan; a train station
 Kami-Imaichi Station, Nikkou, Tochigi, Kanto, Honshu, Japan; a train station